Kira Buckland (born July 16, 1987) is an American voice actress, who has provided voices for English dubbed Japanese anime, cartoons, and video games. Some of her major roles are Jolyne Cujoh in JoJo's Bizarre Adventure: Stone Ocean, 2B in Nier: Automata, Reimi Sugimoto in JoJo's Bizarre Adventure: Diamond Is Unbreakable, Trucy Wright in the Ace Attorney series, Hiyoko Saionji and Kirumi Tojo in the Danganronpa series, Rebecca Bluegarden in Edens Zero, Celine and Elise Schwarzer in The Legend of Heroes: Trails of Cold Steel series, Talim in Soulcalibur VI (including 2B as its guest character), Beatrice in Re:Zero, Heart Aino from Arcana Heart series in BlazBlue: Cross Tag Battle, Mitsuri Kanroji in Demon Slayer: Kimetsu no Yaiba, Falke in Street Fighter V, Edna in Tales of Zestiria, Mary Saotome in Kakegurui, Yung in Godzilla Singular Point, Julis-Alexia von Riessfeld in The Asterisk War, and Kuki Shinobu in Genshin Impact.

Career
Buckland started voice acting in 2004, where she worked on radio dramas, Newgrounds flash animations, and computer/video games. While a student at West High School, she became president of the anime club and founded the first Alaskan anime convention with the president of the anime club from Dimond High, Senshi-Con, based in Anchorage, Alaska. She won the Anime Expo 2007 Idol Voice Acting competition, as well as the Sakura-Con 2007 animated voice acting award. She is primarily known for her voice work on video games and anime shows.

Personal life

Buckland graduated with a degree in Japanese and is proficient in Spanish. She moved to Southern California in 2011 and worked miscellaneous jobs while training to be a professional voice actor, such as a feline neonatal caregiver. 

Before her professional career, Buckland was familiar with the manga series JoJo's Bizarre Adventure, got a tattoo of a star on the back of her neck which resembles the Joestar Birthmark, and during her career expressed a desire to voice of the character Jolyne Cujoh in an official project, which she accomplished with the release of JoJo's Bizarre Adventure: Stone Ocean.

Filmography

Animation

Anime

Film

Video games

Web

Awards

Notes

References

External links

 
 
 
 
 
 

1987 births
21st-century American actresses
Actresses from Anchorage, Alaska
Actresses from Los Angeles
American video game actresses
American voice actresses
Living people
University of Alaska Anchorage alumni